The Science & Faith Tour was a world tour by Irish alternative rock band The Script. The tour supported their second album Science & Faith which was released on 13 September 2010.

Background
The tour began to a sellout crowd at the University of Liverpool on 11 September 2010 and was followed by a six date theatre tour of The United Kingdom. The band then put on two shows in Australia, one in Sydney and the other in Melbourne. On 19 October 2010 the band began the first North American leg of the tour in San Diego's House of Blues. The first North American tour which visited The United States only ended in Boston's House of Blues. On 4 December 2010 the band took part in The Jingle Bell Ball in London's O2 Arena alongside artists including Black Eyed Peas and Nicole Scherzinger. Following this they played a very special intimate show at Dublin's Olympia Theatre. The show took place at midnight directly after a show by Imelda May.

On 30 January 2011 the first full European leg took place, starting in Cologne, Germany before moving onto France, Belgium, the Netherlands, Denmark, Switzerland, Italy, Spain and Portugal and finally Ireland where they played their first arena shows. The band announced three dates in Dublin, Belfast and Killarney, however, within minutes of these shows going on sale, they sold out and resulted in four more dates being added including two more in Dublin and one each in Belfast and Killarney. Within 45 minutes of the band's original seven Irish shows going on sale they had sold in excess of 60,000 tickets.

The band later announced that they would return to The UK in March 2011, this time playing arenas. Tickets for the eleven date tour sold out, resulting in a second London show being added, this time at the world-famous Wembley Arena. The band returned to Australia in April 2011 to perform their biggest headline shows to date in the country. A short Asian leg took place in April also, taking in Singapore, Hong Kong and Manila. Towards the end of April the band announced they would take part in the VH1 Best Cruise Ever along with Maroon 5, Train and Colbie Caillat.
Asia|
A second North American leg began in May 2011 at The Warfield in San Francisco. They also visited Canada for the first time on this tour, performing at Toronto's Kool Haus. This leg finished at New York's Rockefeller Center. In June the band played their first festivals of the year at the Isle of Wight Festival and the Pinkpop Festival in the Netherlands. A South African leg took place in June in which the band performed in Cape Town and Johannesburg, with the latter concert attended by 18,000 people.

On 2 July the band performed at Dublin's Aviva Stadium before their largest audience to date, a crowd of approximately 50,000, This show was titled Homecoming. It was later announced that the show will be recorded for DVD release, a release date has not yet been announced. The band took part in numerous festival around Europe in July 2011 playing at the world-famous festival Oxegen in Ireland. They also played T in the Park in Scotland and the V Festival in England. It was announced that the band would perform at the returning Tennents ViTal with Two Door Cinema Club and Ellie Goulding as supporting acts. The final and biggest North American leg began in Minneapolis with a further thirty dates in Canada and the US. A short Asian leg also took place between 12 and 18 November before the band performed at Christmas Balls across the US in December 2011, ending the Science & Faith Tour in Atlanta on 13 December 2011.

The Script

Danny O'Donoghue – Lead vocals/Keyboard
Mark Sheehan – Guitarist/Backing vocals
Glen Power – Drums/Backing vocals
Ben Sargeant-Bass

Set list

{{hidden
| headercss = background: #ccccff; font-size: 100%; width: 75%;
| contentcss = text-align: left; font-size: 100%; width: 90%;
| header = Homecoming – Aviva Stadium
| content = 
"You Won't Feel A Thing"
"Talk You Down"
"We Cry"
"If You Ever Come Back"
"Before The Worst"
"If You See Kay"
"The End Where I Begin"
"Science & Faith"
"The Man Who Can't Be Moved"
"I'm Yours"
"Nothing"
"Written in the Stars ft. Tinie Tempah"
"Deadman Walking"
"Rusty Halo"For The First Time"
"This = Love"
"Breakeven"
"Heroes" (David Bowie cover)
}}

Support acts

Lissie (Leg 1—United Kingdom)
Michael Paynter (Leg 2—Australia)
Hugo (Leg 3—North America), (select dates)
Joshua Radin (Leg 3—North America), (select dates)
Ryan Sheridan (Leg 6), (Leg 8—Europe), (select dates)
Clayton Senne (Leg 7—Orlando)
The Coronas (Leg 8—Europe), (select dates), (Aviva Stadium, Dublin)
Clare Maguire (Leg 8—Europe), (select dates)
Tinie Tempah (Leg 9—Australia & Aviva Stadium, Dublin)
Andrew Allen (Leg 13—North America), (select dates)
SafetySuit (Leg 13 & 17—North America), (select dates)
The Arrows (Leg 15—South Africa)
Loick Essien (Leg 16—Camden Town only)
Maverick Sabre (Leg 16—Norfolk & Brighton only)
Two Door Cinema Club (Leg 16—Bangor only)
Ellie Goulding (Leg 16—Bangor only)
The Wombats (Leg 16—Bangor only)
Foster the People (Leg 16—Bangor only)
Hot Chelle Rae (Leg 17—North America) (select dates)
Jeremy Messersmith (Leg 17—North America) (select dates)

Tour dates

Festivals and other miscellaneous performances

 A This show was part of the Jingle Bell Ball.
 B This show was part of the Y100 Jingle Ball.
 C This show was part of the WXXL XL'ent Xmas.
 D This show is part of the Radio 1's Big Weekend.
 E This show is part of the Toyota Summer Series.
 F This show is part of the Isle of Wight Festival.
 G This show is part of the Pinkpop Festival.
 H This show is part of the Oxegen Festival.
 I This show is part of the T in the Park Festival.
 J This show is part of the iTunes Festival.

 K This show is part of the Gurtenfestival.
 L This show is part of the Sudoeste Festival.
 M This show is part of the V Festival.
 N This show is part of the V Festival.
 O This show is part of Tennents ViTal.
 AA This show is part of The Edge Festival.
 AB This show is part of Arthur's Day Indonesia.
 AC This show is part of the Y-100 Jingle Ball.
 AD This show is part of the WFLZ-FM Jingle Ball.
 AE This show is part of the WSTR (FM) Jingle Ball.

Cancellations and rescheduled shows

Box office score data

Live recording
It was announced that the band recorded their entire Homecoming show at the Aviva Stadium'' in their hometown of Dublin, Ireland on 2 July. This was released on DVD on 5 December 2011.

References

External links
Official Tour Website

2010 concert tours
2011 concert tours
The Script concert tours